Monkoto Airport  is an airport serving the village of Monkoto in Tshuapa Province, Democratic Republic of the Congo.

See also

Transport in the Democratic Republic of the Congo
List of airports in the Democratic Republic of the Congo

References

External links
 OpenStreetMap - Monkoto Airport
 Monkoto
 Google Maps - Monkoto
 OurAirports - Monkoto
 

Airports in Tshuapa Province